11 Pashons – Coptic calendar – 13 Pashons

Fixed commemorations
All fixed commemorations below are observed on 12 Pashons (20 May) by the Coptic Orthodox Church.

Saints
Pope Mark VII of Alexandria (1485 A.M.), (1770)
Master Malati (1519 A.M.), (1803)

Incidents
Appearance of a Cross of Light above Golgotha (351 AD)
Relocation of the relics of Saint John Chrysostom from Comana to Constantinople (437 AD)
Consecration of the Church of Saint Demiana in El Zaafran

References
Coptic Synexarion

Days of the Coptic calendar